Parhelophilus is a genus of hoverflies. They are slightly smaller than flies of the genus Helophilus, and have a Holarctic distribution.

Species
P. almasyi Szilády, 1940
P. brooksi Curran, 1927
P. consimilis (Malm, 1863)
P. crococoronatus Reemer, 2000
P. currani Fluke, 1953
P. divisus (Loew, 1863)
P. flavifacies (Bigot, 1883)
P. frutetorum (Fabricius, 1775)
P. integer (Loew, 1963)
P. kurentzovi Violovich, 1960
P. laetus (Loew, 1963)
P. obscurior Violovich, 1960
P. obsoletus (Loew, 1863)
P. porcus (Walker, 1849)
P. rex Curran and Fluke, 1922
P. sibiricus (Stackelberg, 1924)
P. versicolor (Fabricius, 1794)

References

Diptera of Europe
Diptera of North America
Eristalinae
Hoverfly genera
Taxa named by Ernst August Girschner